Carl Gustaf af Leopold (1756, Stockholm – 9 November 1829, Stockholm) was a Swedish poet.

Biography
He attained distinction in Swedish letters, his first work to attract wide attention being his Ode on the Birth of the Prince-Royal Gustavus Adolphus (1778). He was appointed private secretary to Gustavus III in 1788 and stood high in the regard of that monarch. His odes on the martial achievements of the Swedes were among his most popular productions, and his tragedies Odin (1790) and Virginia (1902) were highly successful. He attempted all forms of poetry save the epic. In 1799 he was made deputy director. In 1818 he was appointed State Secretary.

He was a bulwark of French Classicism against the attacks of the Romantic Phosphorists. He has been compared to the German Johann Christoph Gottsched. His Samlade skrifter were published (Vols. I-III, 1800–02; Vols. IV-VI, 1831–33).

Notes

References

External links
 

Swedish poets
Swedish critics
1756 births
1829 deaths
Gustavian era people
Swedish male writers
Swedish male poets
Writers from Stockholm
18th-century Swedish poets
18th-century male writers
Members of the Swedish Academy